{{Infobox Organization
|name         = Sandinista Youth
|native_name  = Juventud Sandinista or Juventud Sandinista 19 de Julio
|image        = Logo_of_Sandinista_Youth.jpg

|image_border = 
|size         = 
|map          = 
|msize        = 
|mcaption     = 
|abbreviation = JS
|caption      = Logo of the Sandinista Youth (since 2011)
|motto        = 
|formation    = 1979 ( years)
|extinction   = 
|type         = Youth organisation
|status       = 
|purpose      =
|headquarters = Managua, Nicaragua  
|location     = 
|region_served = Nicaragua
|language     = 
|leader_title = Coordinator
|leader_name  = Milton Ruiz
|main_organ   = 
|parent_organization = Sandinista National Liberation Front
|affiliations = World Federation of Democratic Youth 
|num_staff    = 
|num_volunteers =
|budget       = 
|website      = Juventud Presidente
|remarks      =
}}

The Sandinista Youth (Spanish: Juventud Sandinista or Juventud Sandinista 19 de Julio) is the youth organization of the  Sandinista National Liberation Front (FSLN) party in Nicaragua. The Sandinista Youth arose informally during the Nicaraguan Revolution and it was formally founded by Gonzalo Carrión  after the FSLN victory on July 19, 1979.

Since 2011 the organization has been part of umbrella organization Juventud Presidente, which unites several youth organizations that support Nicaraguan President and Sandinista revolutionary commandante Daniel Ortega.

Besides being considered mainly a peaceful political youth organization, its members—or militants (as they refer to themselves)--have been associated with Sandinista mobs'', parapolice or paramilitary groups to suppress opposition during the times in political power.

See also 
 Sandinista Revolution

References

Sandinista National Liberation Front
Youth wings of political parties